"The Striding Place" is a short story by American writer Gertrude Atherton.  The story was first published in 1896 under the title "The Twins". After improving the story, Atherton renamed the story and republished it in The Bell in the Fog in 1905. It was included in the list "The 13 Most Terrifying Horror Stories" by R. S. Hadji.

References

Sources
 Oates, Joyce Carol American Gothic Tales New York City: Plume, 1996

External links
 

American short stories
Gothic short stories
1896 short stories